Jetsgo Corporation was a Canadian low-cost carrier based in the Saint-Laurent borough of Montreal. Jetsgo served 19 destinations across Canada, 10 destinations in the United States, and 12 scheduled weekend-charter destinations in the Caribbean. At the time the third-largest carrier in the country, Jetsgo abruptly ended service and entered bankruptcy protection on March 11, 2005, leaving thousands of passengers stranded at the beginning of the busy March-break travel season. According to news outlets, the airline was processing orders and taking payments for flights the night before they claimed bankruptcy and ceased operations.

Soon after its demise, the company pledged to make a comeback as a charter-only airline. However, on May 13, 2005, the airline filed for bankruptcy protection, cancelled plans to relaunch service and began the process of liquidation.

History

Jetsgo was launched on June 12, 2002, and ceased operations on March 11, 2005. The airline was Canada's third-largest airline at the time, controlling up to 10% of the domestic market. Expert analysts widely blame the airline for poor management. Founder Michel Leblanc had previously founded Royal Aviation, which he later sold to Canada 3000.

On March 11, 2005, Jetsgo abruptly announced that it had ceased operations. The action stranded thousands of passengers in airports and at their travel destinations with no way home, the defunct airline having made no arrangements with other carriers to handle their passengers. This occurred on the Friday morning before the March Break holiday season, one of the busiest air travel days in 8 of 10 provinces.

1200 employees lost their jobs. Jetsgo had accumulated $55 million in debt in the last eight months before it closed. Employees were finally paid for the time prior to the airline's shutdown on March 14, 2005. Passengers who had purchased Jetsgo tickets were forced to apply for refunds through their credit card companies or travel agencies. Air Canada and WestJet ran additional flights to bring the stranded passengers home.

Because of its abrupt shutdown, the Jetsgo name was frequently corrupted to "Jetsgone" in some media reports. Passenger Satoshi Takano also used this term for a website which he created for former employees. It operated under that name for some time after the company's demise.

In February 2007 the media reported that the United States military was using the former call sign assigned to Jetsgo during flights over European Union (EU) territory. The Sunday Times said that the call sign had been used by military flights involving so-called "extraordinary rendition" of political detainees to black site destinations.

Staff
The airline employed 1,350 people at the time that it filed for bankruptcy.

Incidents and accidents
In March 2005 Transport Canada said that investigators found issues with the operating methods of Jetsgo. The deficiencies were discovered during "a special inspection" into engine problems revealed after a forced landing in Toronto in January 2005.

Number of incidents reported on a yearly basis concerning Jetsgo:

2002: 5
2003: 15
2004: 32
2005: 7
Total (2002–2005): 60

On 20 January 2005 a Jetsgo McDonnell Douglas MD-83 landing in poor weather and low visibility at Calgary International Airport, in Calgary, Alberta, veered left off runway 34 and hit a runway hold-short sign, damaging landing gear and flaps. The plane then declared a missed approach, took off and landed again. There were no casualties.

Destinations

Canada
Alberta
Calgary
Edmonton
Fort McMurray
British Columbia
Abbotsford
Kelowna
Prince George
Vancouver
Victoria
Manitoba
Winnipeg
Newfoundland
Stephenville
St. John's
Nova Scotia
Halifax
Sydney
New Brunswick
Moncton
Saint John
Prince Edward Island
Charlottetown
Ontario
Ottawa
Thunder Bay
Toronto
Timmins
Quebec
Montreal
Quebec City
Saskatchewan
Saskatoon

United States
Los Angeles, California
Florida
Fort Lauderdale
Fort Myers
Sanford (Orlando)
Sarasota/Bradenton
St. Petersburg
West Palm Beach
Las Vegas, Nevada
Metropolitan New York City
New York LaGuardia
Newark

Charter operations
Jetsgo also operated weekend scheduled charter services from Toronto and Montreal to destinations in Cuba, the Dominican Republic and Mexico.

Fleet

Jetsgo operated a fleet of 14 McDonnell Douglas MD-83 and 11 Fokker 100 (plus six Fokker 100 in storage); three more Fokker 100s were due for delivery in 2005. Seating in all aircraft was configured in an "all-economy" setting typical of low-cost carriers. Jetsgo also had special "comfort plus" sections on most of their planes, which featured more leg room on seats A and B in rows 1 - 12, as well as no middle seat.

Slogan
 "Jetsgo. Pay a little. Fly a lot." /"Jetsgo. Moins cher, plus souvent."

See also 
 List of defunct airlines of Canada

References

External links

 Jetsgo (archive)
CTV.ca Timeline of events in Jetsgo's history
Public Documentation on Jetsgo insolvency made available by accounting firm RSM Richter

Airlines established in 2001
Airlines disestablished in 2005
Defunct airlines of Canada
Defunct low-cost airlines
Companies based in Montreal
Saint-Laurent, Quebec